Kirkconnel (Gaelic: Cille Chonaill) is a small parish in Dumfries and Galloway, southwestern Scotland. It is located on the A76 near the head of Nithsdale. Principally it has been a sporting community. The name comes from The Church of Saint Conal. In 1850 the village had only a single street. Next to Kirkconnel is a separate village called Kelloholm.

It is also associated with the ballad Helen of Kirkconnel.

History
The early church and settlement were situated at the foot of Kirkland Hill on the drove road from Ayrshire to Lanarkshire, which followed the steep incline beside the Glenaylmer Burn. Whether Saint Conal was an Irish monk or the son of a local shepherd befriended and educated by Glasgow's Saint Mungo, Christianity came early to this part of Nithsdale. A Celtic cross, erected in 1880 by the Duke of Buccleuch at the instigation of the minister, the Rev. John Donaldson, marks the reputed burial place of Saint Conal.  From the neighborhood of the cross, on a clear day, can be seen the churches at Kirkconnel, Sanquhar and Kirkbride, all associated with Saint Conal.

St Conal's Church is one of the oldest church sites in Southern Scotland with archaeological remains dating to the 9th century and the present foundations of a church dating back to the 12th and 13th centuries.

Life changed dramatically for this small town in the 1890s when a coal pit was opened at Fauldheld.  Coal had always been mined in the district before, but never in large quantities.  From then on coal dominated the life of the little town.  The coal industry moved away in recent decades, and with it much of the population.

Transport
The A76 road runs through the area. Kirkconnel is served by bus routes 221 and 246.

Kirkconnel is served by Kirkconnel railway station on the Glasgow South Western Line.

Notable people
Willie Ferguson - footballer with Chelsea F.C. and Queen of the South F.C.
Kris Haddow - playwright and performer (born Kris Clark)
Bill Taylor - footballer with St Johnstone F.C.
Sam Hastings - footballer with Hamilton Academicals and Clyde F.C.
Alex Parker - footballer with Falkirk F.C., Everton F.C. and the Scotland national football team, started his career with the local club, Kello Rovers F.C.

See also
Deil's Dyke - A linear earthwork.

Notes

References

External links

Local website
Video and commentary on Kirkconnel Railway Station
Video and commentary on Alexander Anderson, poet

Villages in Dumfries and Galloway
Parishes in Dumfries and Galloway
Mining communities in Scotland